Henry Wofford is a sports anchor/reporter for NBC Sports and hosts Raiders Post Game Live, A’s Pregame Live, A’s Postgame Live, and Race Week.

Early life
Wofford was born and raised in Stockton, California, and graduated from Edison High School, also located in Stockton.

Career
Wofford worked as a  reporter at WTHR (NBC) in Indianapolis, Indiana, from 2005 to 2010, as the sports director and anchor at WZZM (ABC) in Grand Rapids, Michigan, from 2003 to 2005, and as a sports anchor at KOLO (ABC) in Reno, NV, from 2000 to 2002.

Wofford also works as an anchor and writer for KLIV 1590 in San Jose, California, and as a news director, anchor, and sports announcer for KSJS 90.5, San Jose State University's campus radio station. He does fill-in shifts for a 95.7 The Game in San Francisco.

He is a member of the National Association of Journalists, as well as the Radio-Television News Directors Association.

Awards
Wofford received first-place awards from the Society of Professional Journalists, in 2008, in Sports Reporting and In-Depth Reporting.  He also received three awards from the Michigan Associated Press, in 2017,  Best Sportscast and Best Reporter, for his feature, "13 On Your Sidelines".

Education
He received his B.A. from University of California, Davis and his M.A. in journalism and mass communications from San Jose State University.

References

External links
 CSN Bay Area Bio

African-American sports journalists
American sports journalists
Living people
Golden State Warriors announcers
Oakland Athletics announcers
American television sports anchors
National Basketball Association broadcasters
Major League Baseball broadcasters
University of California, Davis alumni
Year of birth missing (living people)
21st-century African-American people